The 1931 South Sydney Rabbitohs season was the 24th in the club's history. The club competed in the New South Wales Rugby Football League Premiership (NSWRFL), finishing 2nd for the season and winning their 10th premiership.

Ladder

Fixtures

Regular season

Finals

References 

South Sydney Rabbitohs seasons
South Sydney season